"Running Back to You" is the lead single from American singer and actress Vanessa Williams' second studio album, The Comfort Zone (1991).

The single became one of the biggest hits of her career; it topped Billboards Hot R&B/Hip-Hop Songs chart for two weeks from October 5 to October 12, 1991 and reached number eighteen on the Billboard Hot 100. A colorful music video, directed by Ralph Ziman, was shot for the single. Williams performed the song on The Arsenio Hall Show in 1991.

Track listings and formats
 US CD single
"Running Back to You" (Vanessa's Club Mix) – 7:56
"Running Back to You" (Vanessa's Sweat Mix) – 5:09
"Running Back to You" (DNA Extended) – 5:02
"Running Back to You" (Flip Hop Mix) – 7:01

 US 12" single
"Running Back to You" (The Mix) – 4:41
"Running Back to You" (Edit) – 4:04
"Running Back to You (Flip Hop Extended Version) – 7:01
"Running Back to You (Flip Hop Edit) – 4:29

 US cassette single
"Running Back to You" (Edit) – 4:04
Special previews:
"The Comfort Zone" – 1:00
"Save the Best for Last" – 1:00
"Still in Love" – 1:00
"Better Off Now" – 3:57
Special previews:
"The Comfort Zone" – 1:00
"Save the Best for Last – 1:00
"Still in Love – 1:00

 UK 7" single
"Running Back to You" (DNA 7")
"Running Back to You" (U.S. 7")

 UK 12" single
"Running Back to You" (DNA 12")
"Running Back to You" (Vanessa's Club Mix) – 7:56
"Better Off Now"

Charts

See also
List of number-one R&B singles of 1991 (U.S.)

References

1991 singles
Vanessa Williams songs
1991 songs
Wing Records singles
New jack swing songs